Dolginsky is a rural locality (a settlement) in Vatazhensky Selsoviet, Krasnoyarsky District, Astrakhan Oblast, Russia. The population was 92 as of 2010. There is 1 street.

Geography 
Dolginsky is located 27 km southeast of Krasny Yar (the district's administrative centre) by road. Tyurino is the nearest rural locality.

References 

Rural localities in Krasnoyarsky District, Astrakhan Oblast